Agricultural spiritualism or the Spirit of Agriculture refers to the idea that the concepts of food production and consumption and the essential spiritual nature of humanity are linked. It teaches that spirituality is inherent to human consciousness, is perhaps a product of it, and is accessible to all who cultivate it. The association with agriculture includes such agricultural metaphors as "cultivate" in language used by most mystics across history.

Followers of this idea state the following reasons to justify this link: Agriculture was the preoccupation of the majority of the population of the world at the time that the major scriptures of the continuing religions were compiled; the approach that agriculture takes to creating the optimal conditions for production of its harvest is the same as that recommended by the traditional religions for producing insight or wisdom; historically, the adoption of agriculture liberated part of a population to focus on understanding of spirituality. By understanding spirituality, agricultural spiritualism addresses the questions regarding ethics in agriculture. It serves as a method for communication, and building a relationship, between the spirit of the land and the spirit of the people through an everyday practice.

History
Agriculture is a driving force in the everyday aspect of living on and off the earth's resources. Agriculture was derived from the animalistic and natural forces we feel as humans in order to "control the acquisition and use of energy". Any action by the feeder which increases the yield of a food in a given area over the natural yield turns the particular plant or animal being fostered into a secondary energy trap for the feeder — the one who then utilizes the additional energy produced. This was all considered with our location and actions being in relation to wherever the cosmos were above us and how that energy flows from centers of concentration to regions of diffusion.

Many agricultural rituals that have spiritual origins such as European Christians and Pagans drew their methods from "myths, imagery, and ritual practices from the ancient religions of Greece, Egypt, Mesopotamia, Ireland, and more, or from contemporary polytheistic traditions, such as Hinduism or Afro-Caribbean religions."

Explanation
Agricultural spiritualism is the idea that the methods behind food production, agriculture, the environment, and the key spiritual nature of humanity are connected. It links our basic spiritual natures to the simple aspects of life, like animal welfare, the quality of food, meditation, experiences in the wilderness, etc. Essentially, it's about integrating spiritual practices and values into agriculture and farming to achieve the most efficient food production while also proving to be sustainable.

This outlook on agriculture as a whole is purposeful in connecting the essence of its spiritual roots to modern-day farming practices to uphold farming's fundamentally biological nature while implementing sustainability. While practicing agricultural spiritualism, farmers value altruistic goals like peace and happiness, "We learn to pursue peace and happiness rather than success. We seek harmony among things economic, social, and spiritual not maximums or minimums."

By following this spiritual outlook, farmers are focused on adequate results, only utilizing resources for basic needs and necessary income. They believe that by not pushing for a maximum income, they are able to implement more responsible usage of resources and be in harmony with nature. Following agricultural spiritualism ideals is believed to create a more sustainable farming environment around the world which allows for a sustained desirable quality of life. This means being environmentally responsible and "farming in harmony with future generations being good stewards of finite resources for an infinite future."

Goals and benefits
Agricultural spiritualism seeks a relationship with the land through spirituality. In various cultures with depleting land resources for food, spirituality is valued. Agricultural spiritualism could serve as a bridge between a lack of connection between these two ideals. Agricultural spiritualism incorporates morals into its practice that could address the food crisis problem. The world will require 70% more food by 2050, according to the Food and Agriculture Organization of the United Nations, which is at the cost of the land. Industrial farming is questioned to be sustainable for this demand of food production. Implementing agricultural spiritualism to a populated land relieves stress from the land and allows for a sustainable food sourcing practice that minimizes environmental degradation.

The practice of agricultural spiritualism exercises sustainability. Agroecosystems, which nurture a space for humans and agriculture to cohabitate, provide a system for agricultural spiritualism to be implemented. In terms of agricultural and sustainability, spiritualism is a common ground as discussed in Reclaiming the spiritual Roots of Farming, "A sustainable agriculture, likewise, has personal, interpersonal and spiritual dimensions." The way current food systems are implemented and practiced would provide a space for transition to agricultural spiritualism across more cultures. Many broken food systems would benefit from a connection between the spirit of the land and the spirit of the farmer to address the food crisis. Spiritual alterations in agriculture allow for a harmonious relationship with the earth. The benefits of practicing agricultural spiritualism include seeking harmony in the way people live. By reconnecting with the land, people understand its value. It forms a harmonious relationship between people and the land to be able to create a space for sustainable living. Ickerd mentions, "To farm and live sustainably, we must be willing to openly proclaim the spirituality of sustainability. We must reclaim the sacred in food and farming."

Implementation
Practices related to agricultural spiritualism are being implemented in countries like Thailand and India. In India, agricultural spiritualism is rooted in ideas based on Mahatma Gandhi's agrarian legacy. It is practiced in this manner to reflect a nonviolent agricultural culture along with good food that is not reflected in industrial agricultural practices. Gandhi's Agrarian Legacy focuses on the social needs of village India. For example, Mahatma Gandhi's successors are implementing these practices through farm-ashrams. Ashrams are spiritual centers and communities. In these farm-ashrams, which "emphasize the dignity of human labor and promote 'bread-labor, people are encouraged to actively contribute to the food making processes to be able to consume that food.

A program in Thailand, Moral Rice, connects farmers with spirituality through Buddhism while practicing organic farming. The purpose of this method is to cleanse the farmers' spirit so the rice is purified and the consumers are consuming both spiritually and agriculturally purified rice. The practice of Buddhadasa is working to re-dignify the profession of farming. In Religion and Sustainable Agriculture: World Spiritual Traditions and Food Ethics'' by Alexander Kaufman said that, "In the last few decades, the concept of 'Buddhist agriculture' has been advanced by Thai environmental activists, farmer leaders, and socially engaged Buddhist monks."

Presence within religions
One area in which the relationship between religion and agriculture is visible and encouraged is within the ethnic communities of The Tikar, Aghem, Chamba and Ngemba located in The Bamenda Grassfields of Cameroon in Africa. It is common throughout this region to observe and recognize how their religious interpretations of their surroundings have encouraged the development and emphasis on agriculture as a community. Christian European missionaries would come to Africa in order to spread religion, but ended up spreading the teachings of agriculture and its impacts on society. The people of the Bamenda Grassfields, because of their development being rooted in traditional Christianity, see farming as a religious act because of the belief that the Supreme Being has commanded them to till the earth and have dominion over it. The farmers grow their crops and organize their fields parallel to the control that their Supreme Being has over them as humans or mortal beings. Everything done is in respect to the powerful one and that they have blessed the people of the land with the gift to food and essentially energy and life itself.

There is also a strong religious connection with agriculture within the Pagan groups who believed that their connections with the spirits would create a positive relationship with the land. Many rituals surrounding the planning for planting seasons and harvests along with corresponding feasts rooted many early agricultural societies with spiritual expressions. All of these practices all also corresponded with the natural cycle of the seasons or the cycle of life making the process of agricultural cultivation a very spiritual process. The Pagans even had specific gods and deities specifically related to earthly matters such as growth and creation.

Historically it has been noted that Buddhist communities also faced hardship when their focus shifted to materialistic matters, yet were prosperous and happy during times of agricultural focus. There is also a myth grounded in the Aggañña Sutta which explains how the Buddhist people were able to grow and harvest food easily until they became clouded by "the selfish desire to control nature".

External links
Spirit of Agriculture - a blog detailing the concept of spiritual agriculture
The Spirit of Agriculture.com - a web forum on religion, ethics and the agriculture/food system inspired by the book The Spirit of Agriculture (George Ronald, Oxford 2006)

See also
 Religion and agriculture
 Fertility rite
 List of fertility deities
 Earth goddess
 Fall of man#Agricultural revolution
 List of agricultural deities

References

Spiritualism
Religious studies